Michael Campbell (born 1969) is a New Zealand golfer.

Michael Campbell may also refer to:

Music
Michael Campbell (American musician, born 1985), American guitarist and member of bands Latterman, Kudrow, Laura Stevenson and the Cans, and The Brass
Michael Campbell (musician and actor) (1946–2021), American musician and actor
Michael Campbell (pianist and author) (born 1945), American pianist, teacher and textbook author
Mike Campbell (musician) (born 1950), American guitarist for Tom Petty and the Heartbreakers
Michael Campbell, known as Mikey Dread (1954–2008), Jamaican singer, producer, and broadcaster
Michael Campbell, member of British band Courteeners

Sports
Mike Campbell (American football) (1922–1998), American football coach
Michael Campbell (athlete) (born 1978), Jamaican track and field sprinter
Michael Campbell (gridiron football) (born 1989), American football wide receiver
Mike Campbell (first baseman) (1850–1926), Irish baseball player
Mike Campbell (pitcher) (born 1964), American baseball pitcher
Mike Campbell (Canadian football) (born 1965), Canadian football player
Mike Campbell-Lamerton (1933–2005), British Army and rugby union official
Michael Campbell (basketball) (born 1975), American basketball player
Mike Colin Campbell, English high jumper

Other people
Michael Campbell (bishop) (born 1941), British bishop
Michael W. Campbell (born 1978), Seventh-day Adventist historian and educator
Mike Campbell (farmer) (1932–2011), Zimbabwean farmer who sued the government to keep his land
Michael Che (born 1983) as Michael Che Campbell, American actor and comedian
Mike Campbell, a character in Hemingway's 1926 novel The Sun Also Rises

See also
Mike Campbell (Pvt) Ltd v Zimbabwe, a 2008 case brought by white farmers against the Zimbabwean government regarding their land reform policy